An electoral system satisfies the Condorcet winner criterion if it always chooses the Condorcet winner when one exists. The candidate who wins a majority of the vote in every head-to-head election against each of the other candidatesthat is, a candidate preferred by more voters than any othersis the Condorcet winner, although Condorcet winners do not exist in all cases. It is sometimes simply referred to as the "Condorcet criterion", though it is very different from the "Condorcet loser criterion". Any voting method conforming to the Condorcet winner criterion is known as a Condorcet method. The Condorcet winner is the person who would win a two-candidate election against each of the other candidates in a plurality vote. For a set of candidates, the Condorcet winner is always the same regardless of the voting system in question, and can be discovered by using pairwise counting on voters' ranked preferences.

A Condorcet winner will not always exist in a given set of votes, which is known as Condorcet's voting paradox; however, there will always be a smallest group of candidates such that more voters prefer anyone in the group over anyone outside of the group in a head-to-head matchup, which is known as the Smith set. When voters identify candidates on a 1-dimensional, e.g., left-to-right axis and always prefer candidates closer to themselves, a Condorcet winner always exists. Real political positions are multi-dimensional, however, which can lead to circular societal preferences with no Condorcet winner.

These terms are named after the 18th-century mathematician and philosopher Marie Jean Antoine Nicolas Caritat, the Marquis de Condorcet. The concept had previously been proposed by Ramon Llull in the 13th century, though this was not known until the 2001 discovery of his lost manuscripts.

Example 

Suppose the following matrix of pairwise preferences exists for an election:

where the vertical axis labels of the above matrix indicate the runner and the horizontal axis labels indicate the opponent and votes in a pairwise contest can be found by comparing correspondences of runner/opponent. For example, to calculate the number of votes won by B in a head-to-head contest against A, the middle cell of the leftmost column indicates that B wins 305 votes against A, while the corresponding top cell in the middle column indicates that A gets 186 votes against B; therefore, B beats A in a two-candidate, pairwise election with a total of 305 votes to 186. In the example matrix above, B is the Condorcet winner, because they beat A and C in head-to-head elections.

Proof of violation of fairness 
Note that the quantity of votes might not strongly favor a candidate, but that candidates only need to win the most number of contests in order to be a Condorcet winner. In the above example, B beats two other candidates (there are two green boxes indicating victory for B in the middle row) and A beats one. But the total margin by which a Condorcet winner is irrelevant: a Condorcet winner could win enough contests to be the Condorcet winner by just one vote each, while another candidate might win more votes but fewer contests. Condorcet-consistent voting systems can also, in rare cases, exhibit a preference cycle or paradox, although the circumstances that would cause this has not been known to occur yet in a governmental election using ranked ballots.

Relation to other criteria 
The Condorcet criterion implies the majority criterion; that is, any system that satisfies the former will satisfy the latter. It further implies the mutual majority criterion whenever there is a Condorcet winner; the Smith criterion, which is a generalization of the Condorcet criterion, always implies the mutual majority criterion; not all Condorcet methods pass the Smith criterion. The Condorcet criterion is incompatible with the later-no-harm criterion, the favorite betrayal criterion, the participation criterion, and the consistency criterion. The Condorcet criterion satisfies the following criterion with some similarity to independence of irrelevant alternatives: removing losing candidates from the election can't change the result whenever there is a Condorcet winner.  In addition, adding candidates who are pairwise beaten by the Condorcet winner can't change the winner when there is a Condorcet winner. (These two properties are related to, and implied by, the Independence of Smith-dominated alternatives criterion.)

The Condorcet winner criterion is different from the Condorcet loser criterion. A system complying with the Condorcet loser criterion will never allow a Condorcet loser to win; that is a candidate who can be defeated in a head-to-head competition against each other candidate

Compliance of methods

Complying methods 

The following methods satisfy the Condorcet criterion:

 Black
 Copeland
 Dodgson's method
 Kemeny-Young
 Minimax
 Nanson's method
 Baldwin method
 Tideman Ranked pairs
 Schulze
 Smith/IRV
 Smith/minimax
 Tideman alternative method
 CPO-STV
See

Non-complying methods 

The following methods do not satisfy the Condorcet criterion. (This statement requires qualification in some cases: see the individual subsections.)

 Borda count
 Bucklin voting
 Instant-runoff voting
 Majority judgment
 Plurality voting
 Approval voting
 Range voting
 Coombs rule

Borda count 

Borda count is a voting system in which voters rank the candidates in an order of preference. Points are given for the position of a candidate in a voter's rank order. The candidate with the most points wins.
 
The Borda count does not comply with the Condorcet criterion in the following case. Consider an election consisting of five voters and three alternatives, in which three voters prefer A to B and B to C, while two of the voters prefer B to C and C to A. The fact that A is preferred by three of the five voters to all other alternatives makes it a Condorcet Winner. However the Borda count awards 2 points for 1st choice, 1 point for second and 0 points for third. Thus, from three voters who prefer A, A receives 6 points (3 × 2), and 0 points from the other two voters, for a total of 6 points. B receives 3 points (3 × 1) from the three voters who prefer A to B to C, and 4 points (2 × 2) from the other two voters who prefer B to C to A. With 7 points, B is the Borda winner.

Bucklin voting 

Bucklin is a ranked voting method that was used in some elections during the early 20th century in the United States. The election proceeds in rounds, one rank at a time, until a majority is reached. Initially, votes are counted for all candidates ranked in first place; if no candidate has a majority, votes are recounted with candidates in both first and second place. This continues until one candidate has a total number of votes that is more than half the number of voters. Because multiple candidates per vote may be considered at one time, it is possible for more than one candidate to achieve a majority.

Instant-runoff voting 

Instant-runoff voting (IRV) is a method (like Borda count) which requires each voter to rank the candidates. Unlike the Borda count, IRV uses a process of elimination to assign each voter's ballot to their first choice among a dwindling list of remaining candidates until one candidate receives an outright majority of ballots. It does not comply with the Condorcet criterion. Consider, for example, the following vote count of preferences with three candidates {A, B, C}:
 A > B > C: 35
 C > B > A: 34
 B > C > A: 31

In this case, B is preferred to A by 65 votes to 35, and B is preferred to C by 66 to 34, hence B is strongly preferred to both A and C. B must then win according to the Condorcet criterion. Using the rules of IRV, B is ranked first by the fewest voters and is eliminated, and then C wins with the transferred votes from B.

Note that 65 voters, a majority, prefer either candidate B or C over A; since IRV passes the mutual majority criterion, it guarantees one of B and C must win. If candidate A, an irrelevant alternative under IRV, was not running, a majority of voters would consider B their 1st choice, and IRV's mutual majority compliance would thus ensure B wins; in this way, IRV's failure of the Condorcet criterion here also implies a spoiler effect. In cases where there is a Condorcet Winner, and where IRV does not choose that candidate, a simple majority would by definition prefer the Condorcet Winner over the IRV winner. This anomalous case was demonstrated in the 2009 mayoral election of Burlington Vermont.

Majority judgment 

Majority judgment is a system in which the voter gives all candidates a rating out of a predetermined set (e.g. {"excellent", "fair", "poor"}). The winner of the election would be the candidate with the best median rating.

Consider an election with three candidates A, B, C.
 35 voters rate candidate A "excellent", B "fair", and C "poor",
 34 voters rate candidate C "excellent", B "fair", and A "poor", and
 31 voters rate candidate B "excellent", C "fair", and A "poor".

B is preferred to A by 65 votes to 35, and B is preferred to C by 66 to 34. Hence, B is the Condorcet winner. But B only gets the median rating "fair", while C has the median rating "good" and hereby C is chosen winner by Majority Judgment.

Plurality voting 

With plurality voting, the full set of voter preferences is not recorded on the ballot and so cannot be deduced therefrom (e.g. following a real election). Under the assumption that no tactical voting takes place, i.e. that all voters vote for their first preference, it is easy to construct an example which fails the Condorcet criterion.

Consider an election in which 30% of the voters prefer candidate A to candidate B to candidate C and vote for A, 30% of the voters prefer C to A to B and vote for C, and 40% of the voters prefer B to A to C and vote for B. Candidate B would win (with 40% of the vote) even though A would be the Condorcet winner, beating B 60% to 40%, and C 70% to 30%.

The assumption of no tactical voting is also used to evaluate other systems; however, the assumption may be far less plausible with plurality precisely because plurality accommodates no other way for subsidiary preferences to be taken into account.

Approval voting 

Approval voting is a system in which the voter can approve of (or vote for) any number of candidates on a ballot. Depending on which strategies voters use, the Condorcet criterion may be violated.

Consider an election in which 70% of the voters prefer candidate A to candidate B to candidate C, while 30% of the voters prefer C to B to A. If every voter votes for their top two favorites, Candidate B would win (with 100% approval) even though A would be the Condorcet winner.

Note that this failure of Approval depends upon a particular generalization of the Condorcet criterion, which may not be accepted by all voting theorists. Other generalizations, such as a "votes-only" generalization that makes no reference to voter preferences, may result in a different analysis. Also, if all voters have perfect information about each other's motivations, and a single Condorcet winner exists, then that candidate will win under the Nash equilibrium.

Range voting 

Range voting is a system in which the voter gives all candidates a score on a predetermined scale (e.g. from 0 to 9). The winner of the election is the candidate with the highest total score.

Range voting doesn't satisfy the Condorcet criterion. Consider an election with three voters and three candidates with the following range votes:

In pluralistic head-to-head elections, two voters prefer A to B, and all three prefer both A and B to C, making A the Condorcet winner. However, candidate B is the range winner with 12 points compared to 11 points for A.

Range voting satisfies the Condorcet criterion as long as voters score candidates in the head-to-head elections as they do in the full election. For example, let's say three voters vote for three candidates (A,B,C) as follows: 

The second candidate is the Condorcet winner and the winner of the normal election with 12 to 10 and 0 points. In the case where all voters are voting strategically, range voting is equivalent to approval voting, and any Condorcet winner will win because of the Nash equilibrium as mentioned above.

However, if voters change their voting strategy from honest to strategic only for the head-to-head elections, then range voting does not satisfy Condorcet. For the same example shown above, the head-to-head elections involving A would look like this:

Since in both cases, A would be the winner, the Condorcet winner is A, but B still wins the full election. Some, like the authors of rangevoting.org, say that defining the Condorcet criterion in this way makes the criterion not always desirable. If the winners of the head-to-head contests were determined by range voting rules rather than pluralistic voting, range voting would satisfy Condorcet.

STAR voting 

STAR voting is a variant of score voting with an additional runoff step, where the most preferred of the top-two rated candidates wins. STAR voting does not satisfy the Condorcet criterion. Nevertheless, provided the Condorcet winner is one of the top two rated candidates, it wins the election by virtue of the runoff step being based solely on the ranked preferences between the two.

The following example is an election with 100 voters and 3 candidates {A, B, C}:

 45 voters voting: A=5 B=1 C=0 (Preferences: A>B>C)  
 40 voters voting: A=0 B=1 C=5 (Preferences: C>B>A)  
 15 voters voting: A=1 B=5 C=0 (Preferences: B>A>C)

Under STAR voting, the total ratings are A=240, B=160, C=200, thus A and C are chosen as finalists and the ballots are read again, taking only preferences between the two finalists into account. From the given ballots, we have that 60% of voters prefer A over C, thus A is the STAR voting winner. However, from the preference information alone, we see that B is preferred over A by 55% of voters, and over C by 60% of voters. This makes B the Condorcet winner, and thus STAR voting has failed to elect it.

Proponents of STAR voting argue that this can be a superior result given the extra information available in rated ballots, as the ranking information alone is insufficient information to distinguish between a second-choice ranking being almost as good as a voter's favorite, or almost as bad as their worst case scenario. The above example illustrates such situation, in which the Condorcet winner can be rated very poorly by 85% of voters.

Further reading

See also 

 Condorcet loser criterion
 Condorcet method
Multiwinner voting - contains information on some multiwinner variants of the Condorcet criterion.

References

Electoral system criteria